The following is a List of awards and nominations received by Damian Lewis throughout his career.

By award

Biarritz International Festival of Audiovisual Programming

Television awards

Critics' Choice Television Awards

Emmy Awards

Golden Globe Awards

Television awards

Gotham Awards

Film awards

Satellite Awards

Television awards

Screen Actors Guild Awards

Television awards

By film or TV series

References

Lewis, Damian